Amata simplex is a moth of the family Erebidae. It was described by Francis Walker in 1854. It is found in the Democratic Republic of the Congo and South Africa.

References

 

simplex
Moths described in 1854
Moths of Africa